The sharing of waters of the Kaveri River  has been the source of a serious conflict between the two Indian states of Tamil Nadu and Karnataka. The genesis of this conflict rests in two agreements in 1892 and 1924 between the Madras Presidency and Kingdom of Mysore. The  Kaveri river has 44,000 km2 basin area in Tamil Nadu and 32,000 km2 basin area in Karnataka.  The inflow from Karnataka is 425 TMCft whereas that from Tamil Nadu is 252 TMCft.

Based on the inflow Karnataka is demanding its due share of water from the river. It states that the pre-independence agreements are invalid and are angled heavily in the favour of the Madras Presidency, and has demanded a renegotiated settlement based on "equitable sharing of the waters". Tamil Nadu, on the other hand, says that it has already developed almost 3,000,000 acres (12,000 km2) of land and as a result has come to depend very heavily on the existing pattern of usage. Any change in this pattern, it says, will adversely affect the livelihood of millions of farmers in the state. The pre Independence agreement was based on the area occupied by Mysuru Kingdom and Madras presidency. The areas of South Canara (previously under Madras presidency), Coorg Province which was later merged with Karnataka have not been accounted to calculate the right of Karnataka's water share. Although the River Kavery originated in the Coorg Province, the Coorg province was not included in the agreement. This raises a question about the validity of bilateral agreements between Mysuru and Madras presidencies. 

Decades of negotiations between the parties bore no fruit until the Government of India constituted a tribunal in 1990 to look into the matter. After hearing arguments of all the parties involved for the next 16 years, the tribunal delivered its final verdict on 5 February 2007. In its verdict, the tribunal allocated 419 TMC of water annually to Tamil Nadu and 282 TMC to Karnataka; 30 TMC of Cauvery river water to Kerala and 7 TMC to Puducherry. Karnataka and Tamil Nadu being the major shareholders, Karnataka was ordered to release 192 TMC of water to Tamil Nadu in a normal year from June to May.

The dispute, however, did not end there, as all four states decided to file review petitions seeking clarifications and possible renegotiation of the order.

The first agreement on sharing Cavery river water dates back to 1892, between Madras Presidency and princely state of Mysuru.

History of the dispute

Mysore's plans to revive the irrigation projects met with resistance from the Madras Presidency.  Mysore state made a representation to the Madras Presidency then British government; as a result of which, a conference was held in 1890 with the objective of agreeing "…on the principles of a modus vivendi, which would on the one hand allow to Mysore in dealing with irrigation works, and on the other, give to Madras practical security against injury to  interests" and eventually the Agreement of 1892 was signed.

Things came to a head in 1910 when Mysore, under Nalvadi Krishnaraja Wodeyar as the king and Capt. Dawes as Chief Engineer came up with a plan to construct a dam at Kannambadi village to hold up to 41.5 TMC of water.  The dam was planned to be built in two stages.  In the first stage, a capacity of 11 TMC was envisioned, while in the second stage the full capacity was set to be realized.  Madras, however, refused to give its consent for this move as it had its own plans to build a storage dam at Mettur with a capacity of 80 TMC.

After a reference to the Government of India, permission was accorded to Mysore, but for reduced storage of 11TMC. During construction, however, the foundation was laid to suit the earlier desired full storage. This raised Madras' hackles and the dispute continued.  As a result, the then British Government of India referred the matter to arbitration under Rule IV of the 1892 Agreement. The Cauvery dispute thus had come up for arbitration for the first time.

Sir H D Griffin was appointed arbitrator and M. Nethersole, the Inspector General of Irrigation in India, was made the Assessor. They entered into proceedings on 16 July 1913 and the Award was given on 12 May 1914.  The award upheld the earlier decision of the Government of India and allowed Mysore to go ahead with the construction of the dam up to 11 TMC.

Madras appealed against the award and negotiations continued.  Eventually, an agreement was arrived at in 1924 and a couple of minor agreements were also signed in 1929 and 1933. Clause 8 of Final agreement between the Mysore and the Madras Governments in regard to the construction of a dam and reservoir at Krishnarajasagara — 18 February 1924.

"The limitations and arrangements laid down in certain specified clauses
of the agreement were open to reconsideration at the expiry of 50 years
from the date of its execution. The reconsideration was to be in the light of
experience gained and of an examination of the possibilities of the further
extension of irrigation within the territories of the respective governments
and to such modification and additions as may be mutually agreed upon"

Post-Independence developments
In 1947, India attained independence from the British. Further in 1956, the reorganization of the states of India took place and state boundaries were redrawn based on linguistic demographics.  Kodagu or Coorg (the birthplace of the Cauvery), became a part of Mysore state. Parts of Malabar which earlier formed part of Madras Presidency went to Kerala.  Puducherry had already become a de facto Union territory in 1954.

Redrawing of state boundaries caused parts of Kerala and Puducherry to be in the Cauvery River basin and therefore become stakeholders in the sharing of its waters. Kerala staked its claim as one of the major tributaries of the Cauvery since the Kabini River, now originated in Kerala. The Karaikal region of Puducherry at the tail end of the river demanded the waters that it claimed to have always been using for drinking and some minimal agriculture.  While these additional claims complicated matters greatly at a technical level, Mysore state and Tamil Nadu still remained the major parties to the dispute.

By the late 1960s, both states and the Central government began to realize the gravity of the situation as the 50-year run of the 1924 agreement was soon coming to an end.  Negotiations were started in right earnest and discussions continued for almost 10 years.

Indian Government notifies Cauvery Water Dispute Tribunal

On 20 February 2013, the Indian Government announced the final award. The final award makes an annual allocation of 419 TMC to Tamil Nadu in the entire Cauvery basin, 270 TMC to Karnataka, 30 TMC to Kerala and  7 TMC to Puducherry. Utilisable water in Tamil Nadu is sum of beneficial water uses and the water going waste to sea in excess of 14 TMC at Lower Coleroon and Grand Anaicuts.

The water-sharing criteria are based on two situations:
 When water availability is above the normal water year flows.
 When water availability is equal to or below the normal water year flows
The 50% dependable water year is considered as normal water year whose total water availability in the basin is 740 TMC.  All the unused water in the reservoirs (≥ 3 TMC storage) at the beginning of water year in the basin are also considered for arriving the total available water in a water year to be shared by the riparian states. Tamil Nadu has to use 10 TMC for minimum environmental flows downstream of Lower Coleroon Anicut and supply 7 TMC to Puducherry out of the 192 TMC water released by Karnataka in a normal water year. Kerala can use 21 TMC from Kabini river basin, 6 TMC from Bhavani river basin and 3 TMC from Pambar river basin in a normal year. Water going waste to sea at Lower Coleroon Anicut in excess of 4 TMC (other than 10 TMC minimum environmental flows) in any water year forms part of the utilizable water share of Tamil Nadu. The ambiguity in the verdict is that utilizable water (clauses IV and V) in the basin is allocated among the states but it has not defined how to measure the same. Instead, clause XIV of the final order defines how to measure the beneficial water uses which are not equal to the utilizable water.

According to verdict, monthly release of water from Karnataka to Tamil Nadu in TMCs would be:  – 10 June, July – 34, August – 50, September – 40,  – 22 October,  – 15 November,  – 8 December,  – 3 January, February – 2.5, March – 2.5, April – 2.5, May – 2.5.

Above normal water year
Karnataka can now use all the excess water available in its area after releasing 192 TMC applicable in a normal water year. Tamil Nadu can also use all the excess water available in its area (including flood water from Karnataka if any).

Karnataka has proposed a project to store excess water during good monsoon years at Mekedatu for drinking water needs of  Bengaluru city and en route, hydro power generation, etc. Tamil Nadu is raising objections to this project.

Below normal water year
When the total water availability is below 740 TMC (i.e. distress year), the allocated share of each state is reduced proportionately. Kerala (in Kabini basin) and Karnataka would use their reduced allocations and release rest of water below Billigundulu gauging station for use in Tamil Nadu and Puducherry. Karnataka has to release water to Tamil Nadu on monthly basis proportionate to the monthly figures indicated for a normal year.

limitations for water use
Based on the river basin water data available from the year 1934 to 1971, the tribunal estimated the average water yield in the total river basin as 767 TMC which corresponds to 47% dependability. The live storage capacity available in the river basin is nearly 310 TMC which is 40.5% of the average yield. The water used in the Cauvery delta in Tamil Nadu and Puducherry is nearly 280 TMC which is the tail end water use in the river basin and its regenerated water either goes to sea or outside the Cauvery basin. The total dissolved salt load generated in the basin is nearly 3.5 million metric tons per year. The estimated salinity or total dissolved salts (TDS) for the water available in Cauvery delta is 441 ppm which is close to the safe maximum permissible 500 ppm. There is no limit imposed by the tribunal for the ground water use in the river basin. The tribunal has also permitted the basin states to use all the excess water available in above normal water years. Moreover, the river basin population has reached 40 million in the year 2015 and the increasing per capita inorganic salts used/consumed in industrial, agriculture and residential sectors are enhancing the salt export requirements. When adequate salt export from the river basin is not taking place to the sea by forcing Cauvery delta to face water shortage, the water quality (salinity, pH, alkalinity, sodicity, etc.) available for Cauvery delta would deteriorate beyond the permissible limits impeding its sustainable productivity and its aquatic ecosystem conservation. Ultimately salt export criterion is the limitation for the water resources development in a river basin.

Interim Supervisory Committee
In response to the Special Leave Petition (SLP) lodged by Tamil Nadu earlier, the Supreme Court on 10 May 2013 issued an interim direction to the Government of India (GoI) to establish an Interim Supervisory Committee to implement the Cauvery tribunal order till the constitution of "Cauvery Management Board" as stated in the tribunal order. GoI issued the gazette notification on 22 May 2013 establishing the said Supervisory Committee. Interim Supervisory Committee is a stop gap arrangement when there is delay in getting its approval by the parliament per section 6A(7) of Interstate River Water Disputes Act. However, Interim Supervisory Committee established by GoI under Interstate River Water Disputes Act has full powers  {including suing and to be sued by riparian states/victims for damages / compensation per section 6A(3)} similar to an authority/ board established by parliament till parliament has not annulled the same.

Timeline

1970s
While discussions continued, a Cauvery Fact Finding Committee (CFFC) was constituted.  The brief of the CFFC was to inspect the ground realities and come up with a report.  The CFFC came up with a preliminary report in 1972 and a final report in 1973.  Inter state discussions were held based on this report.  Finally in 1974, a draft agreement which also provided for the creation of a Cauvery Valley Authority was prepared by the Ministry of Irrigation.  This draft however, was not ratified.

In 1976, after a series of discussions between the two states and the Central government chaired by Jagjeevan Ram, the then Irrigation Minister, a final draft was prepared based on findings of the CFFC. This draft was accepted by all states and the Government also made an announcement to that effect in Parliament.

When Karnataka began construction of the Harangi dam at Kushalanagara in Kodagu, it was once again met with resistance from Tamil Nadu.  Tamil Nadu went to court demanding the constitution of a Tribunal under the Interstate River Water Disputes Act (ISWD) of 1956.  It also demanded the immediate stoppage of construction work at the dam site.

1980s
Later Tamil Nadu withdrew its case demanding the constitution of a tribunal and the two states started negotiating again.  Several rounds of discussions were held in the 1980s.  The result was still, a stalemate.
In 1986, a farmer’s association from Tanjavur in Tamil Nadu moved the Supreme Court demanding the constitution of a tribunal.  While this case was still pending, the two states continued many rounds of talks.  This continued till April 1990 and yet yielded no results.

The constitution of the tribunal 

The Supreme Court then directed the government headed by Prime Minister V. P. Singh to constitute a tribunal and refer all disputes to it.  A three-man tribunal was thus constituted on 2 June 1990.  The tribunal was headquartered at New Delhi and was to be headed by Justice Chittatosh Mookerjee.

The four states presented their demands to the tribunal as under

 Karnataka –  claimed 465 TMC as its share
 Kerala – claimed 99.8 TMC as its share
 Puducherry – claimed 9.3 TMC (0.3 km³)
 Tamil Nadu – claimed the flows should be ensured in accordance with the terms of the agreements of 1892 and 1924 (ie., 566 TMC for Tamil Nadu and Puducherry; 177 TMC for Karnataka and 5 TMC for Kerala).

Interim award and the riots 

Soon after the tribunal was set up, Tamil Nadu demanded a mandatory injunction on Karnataka for the immediate release of water and other reliefs.  This was dismissed by the tribunal.  Tamil Nadu now went back to the Supreme Court which directed the tribunal to reconsider Tamil Nadu’s plea.

The tribunal reconsidered Tamil Nadu’s plea and gave an interim award on 25 June 1991.  In coming up with this award, the tribunal calculated the average inflows into Tamil Nadu over a period of 10 years between 1980–81 and 1989–90.  The extreme years were ignored for this calculation.  The average worked out to 205 TMC which Karnataka had to ensure reached Tamil Nadu in a water year.  The award also stipulated the weekly and monthly flows to be ensured by Karnataka for each month of the water year.  The tribunal further directed Karnataka not to increase its irrigated land area from the existing 

Karnataka deemed this extremely inimical to its interests and issued an ordinance seeking to annul the tribunal’s award.  The Supreme Court now stepped in at the President’s instance and struck down the Ordinance issued by Karnataka.  It upheld the tribunal’s award which was subsequently gazetted by the Government of India on 11 December 1991.

Karnataka was thus forced to accept the interim award and widespread demonstrations and violence broke out in parts of Karnataka and Tamil Nadu following this. Thousands of Tamil families had to flee from Bangalore in fear of being attacked and lynched by pro-Kannada activists with the behest of the state government.  The violence and show down, mostly centered in the Tamil populated parts of Bangalore, lasted for nearly a month and most schools and educational institutions in Bangalore remained closed during this period.

The crisis of 1995–1996 
In 1995, the monsoons failed badly in Karnataka and the state found itself hard pressed to fulfill the interim order. Tamil Nadu approached the Supreme Court demanding the immediate release of at least 30 TMC.  The Supreme Court refused to entertain Tamil Nadu's petition and asked it to approach the tribunal.  The tribunal examined the case and recommended that Karnataka release 11 TMC.  Karnataka pleaded that 11 TMC was unimplementable in the circumstances that existed then.  Tamil Nadu now went back to the Supreme Court demanding that Karnataka be forced to obey the tribunal's order.  The Supreme Court this time recommended that the then Prime Minister, P. V. Narasimha Rao, intervene and find a political solution.  The Prime Minister convened a meeting with the Chief Ministers of the two states and recommended that Karnataka release 6 TMC instead of the 11 TMC that the tribunal ordered.  Karnataka complied with the decision of the Prime Minister and the issue blew over.

Constitution of the CRA 

Karnataka had all through maintained that the interim award was not 'scientific' and was inherently flawed.  It had, nevertheless, complied with the order except during 1995–96 when rains failed.  What complicated matters was that the Interim award was ambiguous on distress sharing and there was no clear cut formula that everyone agreed upon to share the waters in the case of failure of the monsoon.

In 1997, the Government proposed the setting up of a Cauvery River Authority which would be vested with far reaching powers to ensure the implementation of the Interim Order.  These powers included the power to take over the control of dams in the event of the Interim Order not being honoured.  Karnataka, which had always maintained that the interim order had no scientific basis and was intrinsically flawed, strongly protested the proposal to set up such an authority.

The Government then made several modifications to the powers of the Authority and came up with a new proposal.  The new proposal greatly reduced the executive powers of the Authority.  The power to take over control of dams was also done away with.  Under this new proposal, the Government set up two new bodies, viz., Cauvery River Authority and Cauvery Monitoring Committee.  The Cauvery River Authority would consist of the Prime Minister and the Chief Ministers of all four states (Karnataka, Tamil Nadu, Puducherry and Kerala) and was headquartered in New Delhi.  The Cauvery Monitoring Committee on the other hand, was an expert body which consisted of engineers, technocrats and other officers who would take stock of the 'ground realities' and report to the government.

Events during 2002 
In the summer of 2002, things once again came to a head as the monsoon failed in both Karnataka and Tamil Nadu. Reservoirs in both states fell to record low levels and inevitably tempers rose. The sticking point yet again, as in 1995–96 was how the distress would be shared between the two states. The tribunal had overlooked this crucial point when it gave the interim award and it had returned once again to haunt the situation.  Tamil Nadu demanded that Karnataka honour the interim award and release to Tamil Nadu its proportionate share.  Karnataka on the other hand stated that the water levels were hardly enough to meet its own demands and ruled out releasing any water in the circumstances that prevailed.

CRA meeting and the Supreme Court order

A meeting of the Cauvery River Authority was called on 27 August 2002 but the Tamil Nadu chief minister Jayalalitha walked out of the meeting.  The focus now shifted to the Supreme Court which ordered Karnataka to release 1.25 TMC of water every day unless the Cauvery River Authority revised it.  Karnataka was forced to release water but pressed for another meeting of the Cauvery River Authority which was fixed for 8 September.  The Tamil Nadu Chief Minister this time boycotted the meet citing insufficient notice as the reason.  A minister from her cabinet, however represented Tamil Nadu. The Cauvery River Authority revised the Court's order from 1.25 TMC to 0.8 TMC per day.

This time however, the Karnataka government in open defiance of the order of the Cauvery River Authority, refused to release any water succumbing to the large scale protests that had mounted in the Cauvery districts of the state. Tamil Nadu aghast at the defiance, went back to the Supreme Court.  Karnataka now resumed the release of water for a few days, but stopped it again on 18 September as a Karnataka farmers and their protests threatened to take a dangerous turn. The centre now stepped in and asked Karnataka to release the water. The Supreme Court meanwhile, in response to Tamil Nadu's petition asked the Cauvery River Authority for details of the water release and water levels in the reservoirs.

Demonstrations

The flare up had by now, well and truly taken an ugly turn and there were accusations and counter accusations being thrown all around in both states. The dispute had already spilled onto the streets in the Mandya district of Karnataka and was threatening to spread to the other parts of the state too.  Precipitating the matters on the streets, the Supreme Court ordered Karnataka on 3 October to comply with the Cauvery River Authority and resume the release of water.

Karnataka once again refused to obey the orders of the Supreme Court. Tamil Nadu filed another contempt petition on Karnataka and soon the issue degenerated into a 'free for all' with all and sundry from both states joining the protests. Soon, film actors and various other cross sections of society from both states were on the streets. Tamil TV channels and screening of Tamil films were blocked in Karnataka. Also all buses and vehicles from Tamil Nadu were barred from entering Karnataka.

The Karnataka Chief Minister, S. M. Krishna on the other hand, fearing that the situation might spiral out of control, embarked on a padayatra from Bangalore to Mandya.  While some saw this as merely a gimmick, some, like U R Ananthamurthy saw it as a good faith effort to soothe tempers and joined him in the yatra.

2003–2006 
This period did not see any major flare up in the dispute even though the summer of 2003 saw a dry spell in both states. The monsoons in 2004, 2005 and 2006 was quite copious and this helped a great deal in keeping the tempers calm.  While the last 3 or 4 years have been relatively quiet as far as jingoistic voices are concerned, a flurry of development has been afoot in the courts.

The term of the tribunal was initially set to expire in August 2005.  However, in the light of the many arguments the court was yet to hear, the tribunal filed a request for extension of its term.  The extension was granted and the tribunal's term was extended for another year until September 2006.  Early in 2006, a major controversy erupted over the 'Assessor's report' that was apparently 'leaked' to the press.  The report had suggested a decision which Karnataka summarily rejected.  Another major controversy erupted when just a couple of months before the September 2006 deadline, the tribunal recommended the formation of another expert committee to study the 'ground realities' yet again.  This was unanimously and vehemently opposed by all the four states party to the dispute.  The states contended that this move would further delay a judgement which has already been 16 years in the making.

More than the disapproval of all the four states of the new expert committee that was proposed, the proposal turned out to be a major embarrassment for the tribunal.  This was because, not only were the four states opposed to it even the Chief Judge of the tribunal was opposed to it.  However the other two assistant judges on 3-man adjudication team, overruled the opinion of the main Judge.  And all this was done in a packed courtroom and this led to petty bickering and heated arguments between the three judges in the packed courtroom.  This left everyone in the courtroom shocked and the Tamil Nadu counsel was moved to remark that it was embarrassing that the judges probably needed help settling their own disputes before adjudicating on the dispute at hand.  Nonetheless, the new expert committee was formed and carried out further assessments.  Subsequently, the extended deadline of the tribunal also passed and the tribunal was given yet another extension.
,

2007 tribunal verdict
The Cauvery Water Disputes Tribunal announced its final verdict on 5 February 2007. According to its verdict, Tamil Nadu gets 419 TMC of Cauvery water while Karnataka gets 270 TMC.  The actual release of water by Karnataka to Tamil Nadu is to be 192 TMC annually. Further, Kerala will get 30 TMC and Puducherry 7 TMC. Water to be released to Tamil Nadu according to monthly schedule as: June month (10 TMC), July (34), August (50), September (40), October (22), November (15), December (8), January (3), February (2.5), March (2.5), April (2.5) and May (2.5). The  Tamil Nadu and Karnataka, unhappy with the decision, filed a revision petition before the tribunal seeking a review.

2012
On 19 September 2012, Prime Minister Manmohan Singh  as the chairman of Cauvery River Authority, ordered Karnataka to release 9,000 cusecs of water per day from the Kaveri to Tamil Nadu. But Karnataka felt that this was impractical due to the drought conditions prevailing because of the failed monsoon. Karnataka then walked out of the high-level meeting as a sign of protest.  On 21 September, Karnataka filed a petition before the Cauvery River Authority seeking review of its 19 September ruling.

On 28 September 2012, the Supreme Court slammed the Karnataka government for failing to comply with the directive of the Cauvery River Authority. Left with no other option, Karnataka started releasing water. This led to wide protests and violence in Karnataka.

On 4 October 2012, the Karnataka government filed a review petition before the Supreme Court seeking a stay on its 28 September order directing it to release 9,000 cusecs of Cauvery water everyday to Tamil Nadu, until 15 October.

On 6 October 2012, several Kannada organisations, under the banner of "Kannada Okkoota", called a Karnataka bandh (close down) on 6 October in protest against the Cauvery water release.  On 8 October, the Supreme Court of India announced the release of 9,000 cusecs had to be continued and it was up to the Cauvery River Authority'''s head, the Prime Minister, as a responsible person, to ensure this happened.  The Prime Minister ruled out a review of the Cauvery River Authority’s decision until 20 October, rejecting the plea by both the Congress and Bharatiya Janata Party leaders from Karnataka. Within a few hours, Karnataka stopped release of Cauvery water to Tamil Nadu.

Tamil Nadu made a fresh plea in the Supreme Court on 17 October, reiterating its demand for appropriate directions to be issued to Karnataka to make good the shortfall of 48 TMC of water as per the distress sharing formula.

On 15 November 2012, The Cauvery Monitoring Committee directed the Karnataka government to release 4.81 TMC to Tamil Nadu between 16 and 30 November.

On 6 December, the supreme court directed Karnataka to release 10,000 cusecs of water to Tamil Nadu. The court asked the union government to indicate the time frame within which the final decision of the Cauvery Water Dispute Tribunal'', which was given in February 2007, was to be notified. This decision was given in the view of saving the standing crops of both the states.

2016
On 22 August 2016, Tamil Nadu approached Supreme Court, seeking direction to Karnataka to release 50.052 TMC ft Cauvery water from its reservoirs for its third samba cultivation, as mandated in the final order of the Cauvery Water Disputes Tribunal 2007. Karnataka cited distress situation as Karnataka felt there was only enough water for drinking purposes  and declined to release water.

On 2 September 2016, Supreme Court asked Karnataka to consider Tamil Nadu's plea on humanitarian grounds and release water and advised both states to maintain harmony. The Court also asked Karnataka to revert by 5 September 2016 as to how much water it can release. On 5 September 2016 Karnataka informed the Supreme Court that it can release 10,000 cusecs per day, while Tamil Nadu demanded 20,000 cusecs per day. Supreme Court ordered Karnataka to release 15,000 cusecs per day to Tamil Nadu for next 10 days till 16 September 2016.

On 9 September 2016, the state of Karnataka observed a bandh and protested against the release of water to Tamil Nadu. Supreme Court was approached by Karnataka citing public unrest, seeking modification of the earlier order. On 12 September 2016, Supreme Court slammed Karnataka for citing law and order problem and modified the 5 September order, directing Karnataka to release 12,000 cusecs of water till 20 September 2016. This decision by the Supreme Court lead to an unrest among the people of Karnataka as the water release limit was increased by extending the number of days and violence broke out in Bangalore, Mysore, Mandya and other parts of state. Two people were killed in the unrest and section 144 was imposed in Bangalore. Curfew was also imposed on few parts of Bangalore.

On 19 September 2016, the Cauvery Supervisory Committee, set up by Supreme Court, ordered Karnataka to release 3,000 cusecs per day from 21 September 2016 to 30 September 2016. On 20 September 2016, Supreme Court directed Karnataka to further release 6,000 cusecs of water from 21 September 2016 to 27 September 2016 and directed the Central Government to set up the Cauvery Management Board in order to provide a permanent solution for the dispute. However, in a special session of the Karnataka Legislative Assembly held on 23 September, a resolution was passed not to release water to Tamil Nadu, hence defying the Supreme Court's order. On 27 September, the Supreme Court ordered Karnataka to give 6000 cusecs of water to Tamil Nadu for 3 days  which was again not carried out.

On 30 September, the Supreme Court gave Karnataka a "last chance" and ordered 6,000 cusecs of water to be released during the first 6 days of October. The Court asked the Central Government to set up the Cauvery Water Management Board by 4 October and immediately do on-site assessments and report back on 6 October. On 1 October 2016, Karnataka filed for review petition over Supreme Court's latest order to release 6,000 cusecs of Cauvery water from 1 to 6 October and also held a special session of the state legislature. After another special legislature session on 3 October, the Karnataka government decided to release water for agricultural purposes, but it was not specified whether water would be released to farmers of Karnataka or Tamil Nadu. 
The Supreme Court on Tuesday, 4 October directed Karnataka to release 2,000 cusecs of Cauvery water per day to Tamil Nadu from 7 to 18 October. The apex court had ordered the state to release 6,000 cusecs of Cauvery water per day. The hearing of the case is adjourned to 18 October.

2018

Supreme Court (SC) on 9 January 2018 declared that it would pronounce its verdict clearing all the pending cases and the confusion within a month. On 16 February 2018, the Hon'ble Supreme Court has pronounced its verdict. Reduced 14.75 tmc water allocation to Tamil Nadu and now Karnataka to release only 177 tmc of water to Tamil Nadu for next 15 years. The verdict also mandated to formally constitute the Kavery river management board by the union government within 40 days for implementing strictly the tribunal award and its verdict.

Kavery Management Board – Govt Gazette
The Ministry of Water Resources and River Development on Friday directed that the Cauvery Water Management Authority be published in the government gazette. With this, the authority, which will play a major role in sharing of the river's waters amongst three states and a Union Territory is finally official. Headquartered in Delhi, the Cauvery Management Authority will be the sole body to implement the Cauvery Water Disputes Tribunal award as modified by the SC. The Centre, as per reports, would have no say except for issuing administrative advisories to it.

The Authority will be assisted in the discharge of its functions by a Regulatory Committee. A bench consisting of Chief Justice Dipak Misra, Justice A.M. Khanwilkar and Justice D.Y. Chandrachud has further directed the government to notify them before the monsoon season sets in June.

It took nearly three months after the Supreme Court order for the Centre to file the draft scheme in court. The NDA government had come under immense criticism for delaying the finalisation of the scheme because of the Karnataka election. The Government's counsel had even said in court that the cabinet was yet to approve of the scheme as Prime Minister Narendra Modi and other ministers were campaigning in Karnataka where election took place on 12 May.

Final verdict 2018
The Supreme Court on 16 February 2018 delivered its verdict in the Kaveri water dispute, allocating more water to the state of Karnataka.

The final allocation for a total of 740 TMC is:
Karnataka : 284.75 (270 + 14.75) TMC  
Tamil Nadu : 404.25 (419 – 14.75) TMC 
Kerala : 30 TMC
UT of Pondicherry : 7 TMC
Environmental Protection : 10 TMC
Inevitable wastage into sea : 4 TMC

Cauvery Water Management Authority (CWMA) and Cauvery Water Regulation Committee (CWRC) 2018

As instructed by the Supreme Court, the Cauvery Water Management Authority (CWMA) was created by the Centre on 1 June 2018. The Cauvery Water Regulation Committee was created three weeks later. S. Masood Hussain was named as head of the CWMA and Navin Kumar was appointed chairman of the CWRC.

See also

 Cauvery river
 Interstate River Water Disputes Act
 Helsinki Rules
 Godavari Water Disputes Tribunal
 Kaveri–Vaigai Link Canal
 Krishna Water Disputes Tribunal
 Water Resources in India
 Right to water
 Water right
 Water law
 Soil salinity control
 Alkali soils
 Palar River

References 

Kaveri River
Politics of Karnataka
History of Tamil Nadu (1947–present)
Rivers of Tamil Nadu
Rivers of Karnataka
History of Karnataka (1947–present)
Economy of Karnataka
Inter-state disputes in India
Arbitration cases
Water disputes in India
Water case law
Water conflicts
Indian case law
Rivers of India